Bernard Alexander Kelly (born 21 August 1928) is an English retired professional footballer who played in the Football League for Brentford as an outside right.

Career statistics

References

1928 births
Possibly living people
English footballers
English Football League players
Brentford F.C. players
Footballers from Kensington
Association football wingers
Bath City F.C. players
Deal Town F.C. players
Southern Football League players